Hildegarde Loretta Sell, known as Hildegarde (February 1, 1906 – July 29, 2005) was an American cabaret singer, who was well known for the song "Darling, Je Vous Aime Beaucoup".

Early life
She was born Hildegarde Loretta Sell in Adell, Wisconsin, and raised in New Holstein, Wisconsin, as a Roman Catholic in a family of German extraction. She trained at Marquette University's College of Music in the 1920s.

Vaudeville and cabaret
Hildegarde worked in vaudeville and traveling shows throughout her career, appearing across the United States and Europe. She was known for 70 years as The Incomparable Hildegarde, a title bestowed on her by columnist Walter Winchell. She was also nicknamed the "First Lady of the Supper Clubs" by Eleanor Roosevelt.

She was once referred to as a "luscious, hazel-eyed Milwaukee blonde who sings the way Garbo looks". During the peak of Hildegarde's popularity in the 1930s and 1940s, she was booked in cabarets and supper clubs at least 45 weeks a year. Her recordings sold in the hundreds of thousands, and her admirers ranged from soldiers during World War II to King Gustaf VI Adolph of Sweden and the Duke of Windsor. On some of her recordings, she was accompanied by band leader Carroll Gibbons. During most of the 1940s she appeared on Raleigh Room, an NBC Radio program.

She wore elegant gowns and long gloves: "Miss Piggy stole the gloves idea from me," she once said. A noted flirt, Hildegarde told risqué anecdotes while giving long-stemmed roses to men in her audience. During one performance, she waltzed with a U.S. Senator. She is credited with starting a single-name vogue among entertainers. Investments and work in ads for a bottled-water company, barley vitamins and a bathtub device gave her a comfortable income through the rock era.

She appeared on the cover of Life in 1939, and Revlon introduced a Hildegarde shade of lipstick and nail polish. She was an inspiration for Liberace, who once acknowledged her influence on his performances: "Hildegarde was perhaps the most famous supper-club entertainer who ever lived. I used to absorb all the things she was doing, all the showmanship she created. It was marvelous to watch her, wearing elegant gowns, surrounded with roses and playing with white gloves on. They used to literally roll out the red carpet for her".

Television and stage
From the 1950s through the 1970s, in addition to her cabaret performances and record albums, Hildegarde appeared in a number of television specials and toured with the national company of the Stephen Sondheim musical Follies.

She appeared as the celebrity mystery guest on What's My Line? on May 8, 1955. After a question from Bennett Cerf about her handing out roses, to which she replied "I don't hand them out, I throw them out!", Dorothy Kilgallen correctly guessed it was her.

Hildegarde sang a presidential nomination campaign song for Margaret Chase Smith's unsuccessful 1964 campaign for president; the song was called "Leave It to the Girls", and was written by Gladys Shelley.

Personal life and death
Hildegarde never married, although she was quoted as saying, "I traveled all my life, met a lot of men, had a lot of romances, but it never worked out. It was always 'hello and goodbye'". She was the business partner and good friend of Anna Sosenko, an aspiring songwriter whom she met at a boarding house in Camden, New Jersey at the beginning of her career. That relationship ended in litigation over the control of receipts from their joint efforts. Her autobiography, Over 50... So What!, was published by Doubleday in 1961.

She died at the age of 99 in a Manhattan hospital on July 29, 2005, of natural causes.

References

External links

Biography on MusicBizAdvice.com

Biography at BigBands and BigNames.com
Hear an episode of her radio show, "Hildegarde's Raleigh Room"

Archives
Hildegarde Sell Papers in the Marquette University Archives
Hildegarde papers, 1936-1978, held by the Billy Rose Theatre Division, New York Public Library for the Performing Arts

1906 births
2005 deaths
20th-century American singers
20th-century American women singers
American women pop singers
American people of German descent
American LGBT musicians
Singers from New York City
Singers from Wisconsin
Nightlife in New York City
Vaudeville performers
People from New Holstein, Wisconsin
People from Sheboygan County, Wisconsin
20th-century American LGBT people
21st-century American women